The Adelaide Equestrian Festival is an annual three-day event held in the South Australian capital of Adelaide. It was known as the Australian International Three Day Event up until 2022. It comprises dressage, cross-country and show-jumping and is usually staged in late April. The event is unique in being held in a city-centre, taking place in the Adelaide Park Lands.

History

The Adelaide International Horse Trials was created in 1997 to replace the Gawler Horse Trials that had been staged in Gawler, north of Adelaide, since 1954. In its period as the Gawler Trials, it was a successful competition and was selected to host the Eventing World Championship in 1986. On this occasion the Australian Post Office issued a special set of commemorative postmarked covers featuring a set of four stamps called Horses of Australia.

In 2007 the event was renamed the Australian International Three Day Event and was held at the end of November each year.  Since 2011 the Australian International is part of the HSBC FEI Classics, an international eventing series of all CCI*****-events around the world.

In 2022 the event was renamed the Adelaide Equestrian Festival and held at the end of April each year.

Event

The event, managed by Adelaide Horse Trials Management Inc, is held throughout the East Parklands in separate stages over three days.

The dressage phase is held on Friday on the arena in front of the heritage-listed Victoria Park Grandstand. The cross-country phase is held on Saturday across the parklands and attracts the most spectators. The course starts in the arena in front of the grandstand, crosses Wakefield Road to Ityamai-itpina / King Rodney Park (Park 15) and then crosses Bartels Road into Rymill Park / Murlawirrapurka (Park 14) and then returns to the arena again. The cross-country course has been designed by Michael Etherington-Smith, who has designed courses for the Olympics in 2000 and 2008 and other CCI***** events, and more recently, by Australian Wayne Copping. The water jumps in Rymill Park are regarded as some of the most challenging in international competition. The final show-jumping phase is held on Sunday in the main arena in Victoria Park / Pakapakanthi (Park 16).

The event also incorporates the Australian stages of the biannual Trans Tasman Championship, which has been staged in Adelaide since 1985.  A youth Trans Tasman is held in the alternate years.

Winners

See also
The other five-star events are:

Badminton Horse Trials
Burghley Horse Trials
Kentucky Three-Day Event
Luhmühlen Horse Trials
Stars of Pau

References

External links
Adelaide Equestrian Festival

Eventing
Horse Trials, Adelaide International
Equestrian sports competitions in Australia